Bikkurim may refer to:

Bikkurim (First-fruits), the Hebrew name for the offering of first fruits
The Bikkurim (Talmud) tractate of the Mishnah and the Talmud